Phi Un-hui (born 2 August 1985) is a North Korean footballer who played as a goalkeeper for the North Korea women's national football team. She was part of the team at the 2007 FIFA Women's World Cup. At the club level, she played for Amrokgang in North Korea.

References

External links
 

1985 births
Living people
North Korean women's footballers
North Korea women's international footballers
Place of birth missing (living people)
2007 FIFA Women's World Cup players
Women's association football goalkeepers
Footballers at the 2006 Asian Games
Asian Games gold medalists for North Korea
Asian Games medalists in football
Medalists at the 2006 Asian Games